Jarosław Miczek (born 1982) is a Polish slalom canoeist who competed at the international level from 1999 to 2008.

He won two bronze medals in the C2 team event at the ICF Canoe Slalom World Championships alongside Wojciech Sekuła (2002, 2003). He also won a silver and a bronze in the same event at the European Championships alongside Dariusz Wrzosek.

References

Living people
Polish male canoeists
1982 births
Place of birth missing (living people)
Medalists at the ICF Canoe Slalom World Championships